Bob Gallagher may refer to:

 Bob Gallagher (baseball) (born 1948), former outfielder in Major League Baseball 
 Bob Gallagher (sportscaster), American sportscaster and radio host
 Bob Gallagher (filmmaker), Irish Filmmaker

See also
Robert Gallagher (born 1969), English commercial and editorial photographer
Robert G. Gallager (born 1931), American electrical engineer